Events in the year 1927 in Bulgaria.

Incumbents

Events 

 29 May – Parliamentary elections were held in Bulgaria.

References 

 
1920s in Bulgaria
Years of the 20th century in Bulgaria
Bulgaria
Bulgaria